Edric George Costain (November 4, 1923 – September 30, 2009) was an American professional basketball player. He played for the Toledo Jeeps in the National Basketball League in three games during the 1946–47 season and averaged 1.3 points per game.

He had spent time as a taxicab driver in Toledo, Ohio prior to working for The (Toledo) Blade as a photographer. Costain worked at The Blade for 34 years.

References

1923 births
2009 deaths
American men's basketball players
United States Navy personnel of World War II
American taxi drivers
Basketball players from West Virginia
Guards (basketball)
Sportspeople from Toledo, Ohio
Sportspeople from Wheeling, West Virginia
Toledo Jeeps players